Stuart Dimond (3 January 1920 – 2004) was an English professional footballer who played as a centre forward.

Career
Born in Chorlton-cum-Hardy, Dimond played for Bolton Wanderers, Bradford City, Winsford United and Mossley.

For Bradford City he made 9 appearances in the Football League, scoring 1 goal.

Sources

References

1920 births
2004 deaths
English footballers
Manchester United F.C. players
Bradford City A.F.C. players
Winsford United F.C. players
Mossley A.F.C. players
English Football League players
Association football forwards